The 2nd African Cross Country Championships was an international cross country running competition for African athletes which was held on 18 March 2012 in Cape Town's Keurboom Park in South Africa. Organised by the Confederation of African Athletics and Athletics South Africa, it was the first time that the competition represented that year's foremost event in the sport, as the IAAF World Cross Country Championships was not held. Twenty-one nations entered athletes into the event and 160 runners participated in the races.

There were four championship races held at the event, featuring senior and junior races for men and women. The senior races were won by Kenyan athletes for a second year running, with Clement Langat and Joyce Chepkirui taking the men's and women's titles, respectively. Kenya also won the women's junior race through Faith Kipyegon, while Ethiopia took the men's junior title as Muktar Edris won that race. Kenya won  both team races in the senior categories and also the men's junior team title. The Ethiopian junior women broke the Kenyan dominance of the event by winning that team title, although Kenya were one runner short of a team and swept the individual medals.

Medallists

Individual

Team

Participation

References

Results
CAA African Cross Country Championships (archived). Finish Time.za. Retrieved on 2012-03-26.
Kenya retains African team crown in Cape Town - Africa Cross-Country Championships wra. Athletics Africa. Retrieved 2019-09-29.

African Cross Country
African Cross Country Championships
Cross Country Championships
African Cross Country Championships
Sports competitions in Cape Town
International athletics competitions hosted by South Africa
Cross country running in South Africa
Cross Country Championships
African Cross Country Championships, 2012
